Shade: Wrath of Angels is a 2004 video game for Microsoft Windows, developed by Black Element Software and published by Cenega. The original name was Nefandus, but later was changed to Shade: Wrath of Angels before its release. The history revolves around an ancient war between angels and gods. An N-Gage version was planned but never released.

Gameplay
Shade: Wrath of Angels is a third-person RPG with over 30 hours of gameplay. The game consists of action/adventure elements with hidden secrets and twists.
The game includes four different chapters traveling through different times and dimensions.
There are 30 different levels with a tutorial included. The player has the ability to wield both weapons or cast spells on 20 different types of enemies. The player also holds the ability to transform into a demon over a limited period  of time. The player can upgrade his health and magic charm by collecting the golden drops, which are available throughout the game.

Plot
The plot revolves around the player receiving an invitation from his brother 'B'. In his letter, 'B' has claimed to have discovered an important archaeological site, which appears to be a very primitive one. But on reaching the town, the player is amazed to find out that all its residents are missing. He reaches the Hotel where his brother has written to be boarded. But on reaching the Hotel, he finds nothing but a pistol left by his brother for him. He decides to check the Church but on his way downstairs, he is stunned to see a zombie, in the lobby. He however shoots the zombie and goes to the Church, only to encounter two more zombies therein. After dealing with them, he finds a secret passage and moves into it to descend down and finds an orb. After the player comes out of the room with the orb, a misty figure appears and reveals to him a fearful secret. The figure reveals to the player that she is the Angel of Faith, and the orb he is carrying is her heart. The Angel of Faith asks the player to release the three other angels to bring his brother back. When the player agrees, the Angel gives him her loyal servant, an immortal red demon to help him on his quest. The player is teleported by the Angel to each of the three worlds where the pieces of the hearts of the other three angels are kept, the first being in the world of undead knights (themed on a medieval period with walking dead, the zombies and undead knights), the second being in the Pyramid of Egyptian God Seth (themed on pyramids, with living statues, mummies and undead worshippers of mighty Seth) and the third being in the world of eternal darkness, the 'Shadowland' (themed on a shadowy plain with creatures of darkness everywhere). But on collecting the three hearts of the angels and reunifying them, the Angel of Faith reappears and reveals her true horrifying form. She turns out to be the Dark Angel, who opposed the Gods and set the war between the four worlds. The player vows to stop the evil by breaking all the hearts of the angels, but the other three noble angels appear and ask the player to destroy the demon, who helped him on his quests. The player kills the demon with his magic sword, and the noble angels trap the Angel of Faith. The angels then reveal to him that his brother's soul is sealed and can not be made to live again. The angels then transform the player to an immensely powerful guardian, to protect all the four hearts of the angels with his magic sword till the end of time, or (if you charged the sword with power, instead of the demon, during the middle of the game) the main character will wake up in the train and his brother is seen on the railway platform.

Reception

The game received mostly mixed reviews. It currently holds a 50/100 score at Metacritic based on 12 reviews.

References

External links

2004 video games
Action-adventure games
Cancelled N-Gage games
Video games developed in the Czech Republic
Video games with alternate endings
Windows games
Windows-only games
Video games about angels
Video games about demons
Video games about zombies
Single-player video games
Tri Synergy games